Ecotoxicity, the subject of study in the field of ecotoxicology (a portmanteau of ecology and toxicology), refers to the biological, chemical or physical stressors that affect ecosystems. Such stressors could occur in the natural environment at densities, concentrations, or levels high enough to disrupt natural biochemical and physiological behavior and interactions. This ultimately affects all living organisms that comprise an ecosystem.

Ecotoxicology has been defined as a branch of toxicology that focuses on the study of toxic effects, caused by natural or synthetic pollutants. These pollutants affect animals (including humans), vegetation, and microbes, in an intrinsic way.

Acute vs. chronic ecotoxicity 

According to Barrie Peake in their paper “Impact of Pharmaceuticals on the Environment.”, The ecotoxicity of chemicals can be described based on the amount of exposure to any hazardous materials. There are two categories of ecotoxicity founded off of this description: acute toxins and chronic toxins (Peake, 2016). Acute ecotoxicity refers to the detrimental effects resulting from a hazardous exposure for no more than 15 days. Acute ecotoxicity is the direct result from the interaction of a chemical hazard with cell membranes of an organism (Peake, 2016). This interaction often leads to cell or tissue damage or death. Chronic ecotoxicity on the other hand are the detrimental effects resulting from a hazardous exposure of 15 days, to possibly years (Peake, 2016). Chronic ecotoxicity is often associated with “particular drug–receptor actions that initiate a particular pharmacological response in an aquatic or terrestrial organism.” (Peake, 2016). Due to this interaction, chronic ecotoxicity is usually not lethal in the way that acute ecotoxicity is. However, chronic ecotoxicity decreases cellular biochemical functions. This often results in alterations to psychological or behavioral responses of the organism to environmental stimuli (Peake, 2016).

Common environmental toxicants 

 Diethyl phthalate- enters the environment through industries manufacturing cosmetics, plastic, and other commercial products.
 Bisphenol A (BPA)- found in mass-produced products such as medical devices, food packaging, cosmetics, children's toys, computers, CD's, etc.
 Pharmaceuticals- a fungicide found in anti-dandruff shampoos. The most common example of this is Climbazole.
 Pesticides
 Some but not all: cleaning products, laundry detergents, fabric softeners, oven cleaners, and disinfectants.
 Phosphates
 Oil

Household products 
In Canada, there is no law requiring manufacturers to state the health and environmental hazards associated with their cleaning products. Many people buy such products to support a clean and healthy home, often unaware of the product's ability to harm both their own health and the surrounding environment. "Canadians spend more than $275 million on household cleaning products in a year." Chemicals from these cleaners enter our bodies through air passageways and absorption through the skin. When these cleaning products are washed down the drain, they can negatively affect aquatic ecosystems. There are also no regulations in place stating that the ingredients must be listed on labels of cleaning products. This often leads users to be unaware of the chemicals they expose themselves and their surrounding environments to.

Fragrance chemicals 
Fragrance chemicals are found in most cleaning products, perfumes, and personal care products. More than 3000 chemicals are used in these fragrance mixtures. The synthetic musks used in detergents accumulate in the environment and are harmful to aquatic organisms. Certain musks are possible endocrine disruptors that interfere with hormone functioning. Phthalates are a common ingredient in these fragrance mixtures found in laundry detergents and fabric softeners. These phthalates (suspected endocrine disrupters) affect reproduction rates, including reduced sperm count in males. Certain glass cleaners and floor polishes contain dibutyl phthalate (DBP). The European Union classifies DBP as very toxic to aquatic organisms. This poses a huge danger as these cleaners, especially the floor polishes, are often rinsed down the drain and into aquatic environments.

Phosphates 
Phosphates are found in many dishwasher detergents, laundry detergents, and bathroom cleaners. They act as a fertilizer in water and in high concentrations can promote algae blooms and increase weed growth. When water containing phosphates are washed into water areas, they carry with them fertilizers, nutrients, and wastes. Phytoplankton and algae flourish at the surface due to increased phosphates. Dead phytoplankton and other organisms sink to the bottom giving rise to large numbers of decomposers due to increased food supply (dead organisms, phytoplankton). Due to the increased number of decomposers that use more oxygen, fish and shrimp at the lower layers of the ocean become oxygen-starved, resulting in the creation of hypoxic zones.

Quaternary ammonium compounds (quats) 
Quats are anti-microbial agents that are found in bathroom cleaners, fabric softeners, and degreasers. They are a class of irritants and sensitizers that negatively affect people who suffer from asthma. These chemicals persist in aquatic ecosystems, and are toxic to the organisms that live in them. Many researchers are concerned that their widespread use in everyday household disinfectants and cosmetics are contributing to antibiotic resistant bacteria, thus limiting microbial infection treatment options.

Trisodium nitrilotriacetate 
Trisodium nitrilotriacetate is found in bathroom cleaners and possibly some laundry detergents, although they are more actively used in industrial formulations. The accumulation of trisodium nitrilotriacetate in the environment can create an overall toxic issue. In aquatic ecosystems, these chemicals cause heavy metals in sediment to redissolve into water. Many of these metals are toxic to fish and other wildlife.

Antimicrobial chemicals 

Personal care products can reach the environment through drainage from waste water treatment plants and digested sludge. Recently, the antimycotic, Climbazole, was detected in wastewater treatment drainages. Climbazole is readily used in cosmetics, and is an ingredient in anti-dandruff shampoos. Shampoos contain formulations of up to 2% which is the equivalent of approximately 15g/L. Climbazole is classified as extremely toxic to aquatic organisms. It affects the growth of green algae Pseudokirchneriella subcapitata at very low concentrations. Zebrafish experienced lethal effects after exposure to climbazole in laboratory testing. Effects included thickening of fertilized eggs, lack of somite formation, lack of detachment of the tail bud from the yolk sac, and lack of a heartbeat were all evaluated to occur after 48 hours. Danio rerio, Lemna minor, Navicula pelliculosa, Pseudokirchneriella subcapitata, and Daphnia magna were all tested and found to be negatively affected by climbazole in a concentration-dependent manner, with the highest toxicity observed in Lemna minor. Effects included stunted colony growth and darkening in color. Effects of climbazole on oats and turnip included stunted growth of the leaves and shoot, as well as turning darker in color. The aquatic ecotoxicity of climbazole can be classified as very toxic to Lemna and algae, toxic to fish, and harmful to Daphnia.

Plasticizers 
Phthalates and BPA date back to the 1920s and 1930s. Phthalates have been applied as polyvinyl chloride (PVC) additives since 1926, but were also used for health care purposes as insect repellents and cercaricides. BPA is present in most aquatic environments, entering water systems through landfills and sewage treatment plant runoff, resulting in the bioaccumulation of aquatic organisms.  These endocrine disrupters are a large group of chemicals that enter into the aquatic environment through the manufacturing of various industrial and consumer products, agriculture and food/drug processing, waste water treatment plants, and human waste. Phthalate esters are common additives that soften and make PVC more flexible. It is used in many everyday items such as medical devices, packaging for fragrances and cosmetics, ropes and varnishes, in plastic used to wrap food, and shower curtains. These Phthalate esters have been found in water, air, sediment, and in gulfs and rivers around the world, Giam et al. as cited by. Phalates and BPA affect reproduction in animal groups such as Molluscs, crustaceans, amphibians and fish. Most of these plasticizers affect hormone systems. Some phthalates have even larger pathways of disruption. Phthalates and BPA have been proven to affect development and reproduction in a variety of species. Disturbances include changes in the number of offspring produced and reduced hatching success. In amphibians for example, phthalates and BPA disrupt thyroid functioning, which in turn impacts larval development. Molluscs, crustaceans, and amphibians appear to be more responsive than fish, with most effects being induced in low concentration ranges, with the exception of disrupted spermatogenesis in fish in the low range. A Phthalate referred to as diethyl phthalate (DEP) enters the aquatic environment through industries that manufacture cosmetics, plastics and many commercial products that pose hazards to aquatic organisms and human health. Through exposing an adult male common Carp (Cyprinus carpio) to LC50 doses, it was evident that bioaccumulation of DEP in the testis, liver, brain, gills and muscle tissue was present. Fish exposed to 20 ppm of DEP became drowsy and discolored during the onset of the fourth week. Sources of DEP contamination and accumulation in humans include cosmetic products and dietary meat of fish, Persky et al. This DEP acts as a cosmetic ingredient and vehicle for fragrances, both which come in contact with the skin. Many countries around the world practice sewage fed fisheries, where waste waters are used for the purpose of culturing fish. Endocrine disruption and a presence of phthalate residue is highly likely to be observable in these sewage fed fish. This is particularly true when waste water from various industries and garbage containing DEP are released into these waters. Through a DEP treatment with Cyprinus carpio, liver size was observed to increase and testis size decreased. In fish muscle, ALT and AST activities decreased due to DEP treatment. Like many toxic chemicals, DEP has been known to affect metabolic enzyme profiles and phosphates and transaminases activities, Ghorpade et al. as cited by. A decrease in immunity of M. rosenbergii after exposure to DEP was also noted. Given that certain biological effects occur due to chemical concentrations found in plasticizers used in the laboratory coincide with concentrations present in the environment, certain wildlife species must be negatively impacted.

Pesticides 
Pesticides often pose serious problems to the environment. They kill not only targeted organisms, but also non-targeted organisms in the process. Pesticides are released into the natural environment intentionally by people who are often unaware that these chemicals will travel further than anticipated, Hatakeyama et al. as cited in. Thus, pesticides largely affect the natural communities in which they are used. They negatively affect multiple levels, ranging from molecules, to tissues, to organs; to individuals, to populations, and onto communities. In the natural environment, a combination of pesticide exposure and natural stressors such as fluctuating temperature, food shortages, or decreased oxygen availability are worse than when presented alone. Pesticides can affect the feeding rates of zoo-plankton. In the presence of pesticides, zoo-plankton display lower feeding rates which result in reduced growth and reproduction. Swimming may also be affected by pesticides, which poses a life-threatening issue for zoo-plankton as they swim to obtain food and avoid predators. Such changes may alter predator-prey relationships. A spinning behavior became apparent in Daphnia when induced by carbaryl. The presence of carbaryl increased the probability of the Daphnia being eaten by other fish, Dodson et al. as cited by. The toxicant pentachlorophenol increases swimming speed in the rotifer Brachionus calyciflorus. This in turn increased the encounter rate of predators, Preston et al. as cited by.

Oil spills 
One of the major environmental impacts of oil exploration on the environment is the contamination of aquatic ecosystems from oil spills and oil seepages. Oftentimes, much like the case in the Amazon, oil is used to control dust on roadways, causing the precipitation runoff from these roads to also be contaminated. Direct human health hazards occur since many people, including children, walk barefoot on these oiled roads. This puts them in direct contact with crude oil. Other hazards to humans include seepages into ponds that provide drinking water for the population. During the exploration for oil, mud that has been drilled is deposited into pits. These production pits are often not lined, risking the possibility for contaminants to leak into the surrounding environment. Environmental concerns are primarily focused on a group of polycyclic aromatic hydrocarbons (PAHs). "PAHs accumulate on particles and sediments, which tend to protect them from biodegrading processes", Green and Trett as cited in. Samples were collected from four sites (13 stations) in the Amazon where crude oil was the main pollutant. The water collected from Site B, a drinking water pond located 100m from an in use pit, had the highest total petroleum hydrocarbon (THP) concentration. Sediments were found to be acutely phototoxic. This area, which has poorly developed infrastructure, is one where residents collect water for drinking, cooking, and bathing from the rivers and ponds nearby. "A recent study observed excess cancer rates in a village in this region" Sebastian et al., as cited in. Not only were excess cancer rates apparent, but many people in this area that were consuming the water became ill. In Wernersson's study, toxicity of water and sediment samples were studied on Daphnia magna (a crustacean zoo-plankton species) and Hyalella azteca (an amphipod). These samples were collected from four sites where crude oil was the main source of pollution. 1-4 day-old organisms of both species were used in the tests. Immobility of D. magna was recorded after 24 hours of exposure indoors. They were then moved outdoors where they were exposed to sunlight. After 1-2 hours, the samples were removed from the sunlight. It was found that D. magna often recovered within an hour after UV exposure. Hyalella azteca was cultured in the same medium as was used for the D. magna species. To minimize stress, shade was provided. 16 hours of light and 8 hours of darkness were provided. Lethality was recorded after 96 hours of exposure.

Overall environmental impact

Ecotoxicity has given us a better understanding of the extent of damage caused by the release of toxic chemicals into our environment. According to the National Library of Medicine; “Current estimates project that every year, a combined load of millions of tons of potentially toxic chemicals enters the environment from a broad range of industrial and domestic processes.” (Fantke, 2020). Some of these toxic chemicals are discharged into lakes, rivers, the ocean, and groundwater. Animals, plants, and water surfaces can also be exposed from airborne chemical emissions caused from cities, factories, and fires (Fantke, 2020). Chemical sludge often gets into agricultural and industrial soils as well.

These chemicals degrade into the environment and can become toxic metabolites. When this happens they “have the potential to bioaccumulate and biomagnify in species of higher trophic levels.” (Fantke, 2020). This can result in a wide variety of consequences, including but not limited to: the extinction of environmentally sensitive species, alterations to local food webs, physiological and genetic changes, and changes in reproduction, growth, and behavior (Fantke, 2020). Although much research into ecotoxicity has been done, there is still uncertainty about the true extent of damage caused. There may be long-term consequences on the structure and function of local and global ecosystems we are yet to understand.

See also 

 Ecotoxicology
 Toxicity
 Toxicology
 Ecology

References

Further reading

External links 
 Ecotoxmodels.org is a website on models for ecotoxicity.
 Ecotoxicity definition on the Science-in-the-Box website of P&G
EXTOXNET – The EXtension TOXicology NETwork
 EPA ECOTOX Database (US Environmental Protection Agency)- Aquatic and Terrestrial Plant and Animal toxicity data for many common test species

Toxicology

Ecology